Ptinus clavipes is a species of spider beetle in the family Ptinidae.

References

Further reading

 
 
 
 
 

Ptinus
Beetles of Asia
Beetles of Australia
Beetles of Europe
Beetles of North America
Beetles described in 1792
Taxa named by Georg Wolfgang Franz Panzer